Fergus Wallace (born 2 February 1965) is a Scottish former rugby union player for Glasgow Rugby, now known as Glasgow Warriors. He played as a flanker.

Rugby Union career

Amateur career

Wallace's playing career straddled the amateur and professional era.

He began his club career with Clarkston before moving on to Glasgow High Kelvinside, Boroughmuir, Hamilton and Glasgow Hawks.

Provincial career

He captained the amateur Glasgow District in season 1989-90 when they famously won the Scottish Inter-District Championship that season, and were unbeaten the entire season, also beating the touring Fiji international side. He captained the Glasgow District side for 6 years.

As the Flanker named for Warriors first match as a professional team - against Newbridge in the European Challenge Cup - Wallace has the distinction of being given Glasgow Warrior No. 6 for the provincial side.

He played for the professional Glasgow side in the Heineken Cup in 1997-98. Glasgow got to the European Cup's quarter-finals that year; which remains the Glasgow Warriors best joint-equal performance in that competition.

International career

Fergus narrowly missed out on a full Scotland international cap. He has stated "Not getting a full cap was disappointing and I think I might have got in if they had selected the team differently in 1994. I was in the Scotland A side that beat South Africa at The Greenyards and had a good game, scoring our try, but strangely they had picked the Scotland team for the Test match before the A game." However he now jokes about this; he told the St. Andrews Sporting Club: "I was often compared to the Lions great, Willie John McBride. Yes, folk would say to me: 'Compared to Willie John McBride, you're rubbish!'" 

Wallace did however get capped by Scotland A and Scotland Sevens and also captained a Scotland XV against Zimbabwe. He also played for a veteran British and Irish Lions side in 2001.

Administration

He moved back to rugby becoming the Business Development Manager of Glasgow Warriors in November 2011.

Outside of rugby

On leaving rugby Fergus became a painter and decorator, then a chartered surveyor. He also worked with networking companies Laads Consultancy and Klas International.

In December 2014 he moved to become the Head of Sports Partnerships at House of Fraser.

External links
 Rotary Club
 Warriors success plan
 Glasgow Hawks

References

1965 births
Living people
Rugby union flankers
Glasgow Warriors players
Glasgow District (rugby union) players
Glasgow Hawks players
Glasgow High Kelvinside RFC players
Clarkston RFC players
Scotland 'A' international rugby union players
Scotland international rugby sevens players
Scottish rugby union players
Male rugby sevens players